The 1961 Southeast Asian Peninsular Games, officially known as the 2nd Southeast Asian Peninsular Games, was a Southeast Asian multi-sport event held in Rangoon, Burma from 11 to 16 December 1961 with 13 sports featured in the games. This was the first time all six founding members of the SEAP Games Federation competed in the biennial sports festival and the first time Myanmar, then known as Burma hosted the games. Burma, later known as Myanmar is the second country to host the Southeast Asian Peninsular Games, which later known as the Southeast Asian Games after Thailand. The games was opened and closed by Win Maung, the President of Burma at the Bogyoke Aung San Stadium. The final medal tally was led by host Burma, followed by Thailand and Malaya.

The games

Participating nations

  (host)
 
 
 
 
 
 

1

Sports

Medal table

Key

Winners

References

External links
 Medal Tally 1959–1995
 Medal Tally
 History of the SEA Games
 OCA SEA Games
 SEA Games previous medal table
 SEAGF Office  
 SEA Games members

Southeast Asian Games
Southeast Asian Peninsular Games, 1961
S
1961 in multi-sport events
Multi-sport events in Myanmar
Sport in Yangon
20th century in Yangon
December 1961 sports events in Asia